Nosratabad-e Laklar (also Romanized as Noşratābād-e Laklar) is a village in Gavdul-e Markazi Rural District, in the Central District of Malekan County, East Azerbaijan Province, Iran. At the 2006 census, its population was 676, in 155 families.

References 

Populated places in Malekan County